The  Wuhan Junshan Yangtze River Bridge is a large cable-stayed bridge over the Yangtze River. The bridge carries 6 lanes of traffic between the Caidian District and the Jiangxia District of Wuhan, Hubei. A concurrency of expressways go over the bridge: The G4 Beijing–Hong Kong and Macau Expressway, the G50 Shanghai–Chongqing Expressway, and the G4201 Wuhan Ring Expressway. The bridge, which was opened in 2001, is one of the largest cable-stayed bridges in the world.

The bridge is named for Junshan (军山, "the Army Mountain"), a lone mountain on the left bank of the Yangtze upstream from the bridge.

References

See also
Yangtze River bridges and tunnels
List of largest cable-stayed bridges

Bridges in Wuhan
Bridges over the Yangtze River
Cable-stayed bridges in China
Bridges completed in 2001
Transport in Hubei
2001 establishments in China